One Touch of Nature may refer to:

 One Touch of Nature (1909 film)
 One Touch of Nature (1917 film)

See also
 Nature's Touch